Southend Leisure & Tennis Centre, also referred to as Garon Park, is a sports centre located in Southend-on-Sea, Essex, England. The centre was built in March 1996 and expanded in November 2010, adding Southend Swimming and Diving Centre to the site, with a new reception area linking the two centres together with self-swiping turnstiles. The site's main name remained as Southend Leisure & Tennis Centre with the addition of Southend Swimming and Diving Centre. The centre is run by Fusion Lifestyle.

Facilities
The Leisure Centre offers the following facilities:

 Expressions Gym
 Group Fitness Studio
 Sauna, Steam Room & Spa
 4 Indoor Tennis Courts
 8 Court Sports Hall
 2 Court Secondary Hall
 3 Basketball Courts British Basketball League Standard
 Fully Flood-Lit:
 8 lane Olympic size Athletics Track
 4 Outdoor Tennis Courts
 4 Outdoor Netball Courts
 Cappuccino Bar & Cafe
 Small Steps Day Nursery
 Function Rooms & Suites
 Spectator seating & Disabled access for:
 25m Swimming Pool
 Fun Pool & Slide
 Olympic Diving Facility

Regular hosts
Each year, Southend Leisure & Tennis Centre hosts regular users and events:

 The Olympic size Athletics Track has been the host for Southend-on-Sea Athletic Club since 1994. The track itself was refurbished in 2011.
 The 8 Court Main Hall hosts events such as wrestling and cage fighting events in the  Ultimate Warrior Challenge.
 The centre is also home to the British Basketball League team the Essex Pirates.

Olympic training ground
After resurfacing & refurbishment of the athletics track in 2011, the site was proposed to be used as an Olympic Training Ground for the London 2012 Summer Olympics in the following sports:
 Athletics
 Basketball
 Diving

References

Indoor arenas in England
Sports venues in Essex
Southend-on-Sea (town)